Huda is a gender neutral name, pronounced:  (sometimes spelled as Hoda or Houda) which means "right guidance". This page indexes people who use the name as their given name.

It may refer to:

Females with this first name 
 Hoda Abdel Hamid is a war correspondent with Al Jazeera.
 Huda al-Attas (born 1970), Yemeni writer
 Huda al-Baan (born 1960), Yemeni politician
 Huda Akil (born 1945), American neuroscientist
 Huda Ben Amer, Libyan politician
 Huda Kattan (born 1983), Iraqi-American beauty product developer, CEO of Huda Beauty
 Huda Hussein (born 1965), Kuwaiti actress and producer
 Hüda Kaya (born 1960), Turkish politician
 Huda Lutfi (born 1948), Egyptian artist 
 Huda Naamani (born 1930), Lebanese writer
 Huda Naccache, Israeli model
 Huda Otoum, Jordanian politician
 Huda Sajjad Mahmoud Shaker, (born 1978), Iraqi politician
 Huda Salih Mahdi Ammash (born 1953), Iraqi scientist
 Huda Sha'arawi (1879–1947), Egyptian political activist
 Huda Sultan (1925 – 2006), Egyptian actress and singer
 Huda Totonji, Saudi Arabian artist
 Huda Ziad (born 1983), Pakistani cricketer
 Huda Zoghbi (born 1955), Lebanese medical researcher
Huda AlAskar (born 1993), Kuwaiti Scientist
 Huda Suleiman Salim (born 1984), Government servant at Ministry of Planning and Finance Zanzibar Tanzania

Males with this first name 
 Huda bin Abdul Haq (1960 – 2008), Indonesian mass murder

Middle name
Nazmul Huda Bachchu (1938 — 2017), Bangladeshi actor
Noor ul Huda Shah, Pakistani dramatist and politician
Nurul Huda Abdullah (born 1972), Malaysian swimmer
S. H. Bihari (Shamsul Huda Bihari) (1922-1987), Indian music director, songwriter and poet
Shams-ul-Huda Shams (died 2005), Afghan politician
Shamsul Huda Chaudhury (1920 – 2000), Bangladeshi politician

See also 

Hoda (given name)
Houda (given name)